National Girobank was a British public sector financial institution run by the General Post Office that opened for business in October 1968. It started life as National Giro  then National Girobank and finally Girobank plc before being absorbed into Alliance & Leicester plc in 2003.

The organisation chalked up notable firsts. It was the first bank designed with computerised operations in mind; the first bank in Europe to adopt OCR (optical character recognition) technology; the first bank to offer interest-bearing current accounts, and the first bank in Europe to offer telephone banking, operating several years prior to the start of Midland Bank's First Direct service.  It is widely credited for shaking up the UK banking market, forcing competitors to innovate and respond to the needs of the mass market.

Concept 

Postal giro or postgiro systems have a long history in European financial services. The basic concept is that of a banking system not based on cheques, but rather by direct transfer between accounts.  If the accounting office is centralised, then transfers between accounts can happen simultaneously. Money could be paid in or withdrawn from the system at any post office, and later connections to the commercial banking systems were established, often by the convenience of the local bank opening its own account at the Postgiro.

By the middle of the 20th century, most countries in continental Europe had a postal giro service. The world's first post office giro banking system was established in Austria in the late 19th century by the Österreichische Postsparkasse. By the time the British Postgiro was conceived, the Dutch Postgiro was very well established with virtually every adult having a postgiro account with very large and well-used postgiro operations in most other countries in Europe and Scandinavia.

The term "bank" was not used initially to describe the service. The banks' main payment instrument was based on the "cheque" which has a totally different remittance model from the "giro".

In the banking model, cheques are written by the remitter and then handed or posted to the payee who must then visit a bank or post the cheque to his bank. The cheque must then be cleared, a complex process by which cheques are sorted once, posted to a central clearing, sorted again, and then posted back to the paying branch where the cheque is finally checked and then paid.

In the postal giro model, giro transfers are sent through the post by the remitter to the Giro Centre. On receipt, the transfer is checked and the account transfer takes place. If the transfer is successful, the transfer document is sent to the recipient, together with an updated statement of the account being credited. The remitter is also sent an updated statement. In the case of large utilities receiving thousands of transactions per day, statements would be sent electronically and incorporate a reference number uniquely identifying the remittance for reconciliation purposes.

History

Reason for establishment in the UK 
In 1959 the Radcliffe Committee set up to investigate the "Working of the Monetary System in the United Kingdom" recommended the introduction of a giro system, and if the main banks did not do this, the possibility of the Post Office introducing it should be investigated.

Politics played a part in the development of the National Giro.  It reflected a general feeling in the Labour Movement that the banks were not meeting the mass banking needs of the British population. In the early 1960s, the majority of adults in the United Kingdom did not have a bank account and the banks did not court business from the working classes, which they regarded as unprofitable.  Working-class employees would be paid weekly in cash, while those in the middle class were more likely to be salaried and paid with a bank cheque at the end of the month. Those who could afford to have a bank account could pay the cheque into the account, but even among the middle class, many had no bank account. It was common practice for cheques to be endorsed to local traders (and especially the milkman) who would know the customer and be prepared to exchange the cheque for cash.

In the 1960s, although most towns had one or more bank branches, smaller communities very often had no bank branch at all. Post offices, on the other hand were just about in every community. There used to be about 22,000 post offices in the UK compared to about 3,000 bank branches. The Post Office was ideally placed to establish a viable mass banking system.

The banks also were rather secretive about their tariff structures which were never published. The Post Office would publish a tariff of charges, the key one being that transfers between accounts would be free of charge, thus encouraging the adoption of the system. At a stroke the National Giro, as the service would be called, would, it was hoped, revolutionise banking in the UK.

Planning for the National Giro 
In 1965 a white paper "A Post Office Giro" was published, outlining a system which would use post offices as its business outlets, with automated central processing of transactions.

Computerisation, it was argued, would transform the profitability of the new system, and it was estimated that a payment between two National Giro accounts could be made in 24 hours if there was a central accounting office at a good communications hub; this would be faster than the existing national cheque clearing system.

The Wilson government placed an Act before Parliament, and the Post Office's central planning department and its new Computer Division began business and technical planning for the new service.

By 20 September 1965 a central site was chosen at Bootle in Lancashire. The Post Office bought land on the site of sidings of the North Mersey Branch railway. It also built a large, purpose built office and data processing complex for the site, completed in March 1968.

The National Giro was the first financial institution in Europe, and probably the world, to be established from the outset to be fully computerised. It broke new ground in Europe when it adopted optical character recognition for its transfer, in-payment and out-payment transaction documents, making it possible for the first time for utility companies and mail order companies to print their own personalised remittance slips and automate at least part of the complex accounting processes.

Uncertainty and the "Green Light" 

The early years of National Giro were unprofitable. This was hardly a surprise given that a huge amount had been invested in establishing a service infrastructure that began with zero customers. Similar types of enterprise such as the credit card operator, Barclaycard, would also take many years to begin to build a base from which to begin recouping both capital and labour costs. Nevertheless, the largely middle-class press led by the Daily Telegraph and the Daily Mail were hostile to the creation of the National Giro as were the banks, which saw it as a long term threat.

In 1969 National Giro partnered with the Mercantile Loan Company to provide loans to account holders, which was a significant stimulation of account growth.

When a Conservative government came to power in 1970, there were pressures on the government to close the still loss-making operation.

The Post Office made a strong case for adding new services that could transform the financial viability of the operation. Essentially, it proposed that it tackle both the income and expenditure side of the business.

 On the expenditure side, it would limit the growth in staff by limiting the plans for expanding the personal customer base. As this grew, transaction costs grew (including the cost of remitting all those daily movement statements). Advertising ceased and charges were introduced that would discourage further growth in the personal giro account business.
 It also proposed that the government itself should start using the Giro by making social security payments through the service. As most people still did not have bank accounts, this led to the birth of the girocheque, a payment instrument exchangeable at the Post Office for cash, but equally capable of being paid into any bank account.

The biggest change, however, took place behind the scenes. Instead of focusing on the needs of the utilities (which had by this time already adopted the Giro) and the personal banking market, National Giro would aim to capture the cash deposit business then dominated by the commercial clearing banks.  The Post Office itself was a major customer of the commercial banks. It had a constant need for cash in order for it to pay out social security payments (welfare payments and pensions). Banknotes and coins had to be obtained from the banks which charged a fee for this service. The banks were also charging the depositors of these notes and coins, all of which needed to be counted before being passed on to the Post Office (which itself then had extra costs in counting the money provided by the banks.  The new system was much simpler. Large depositors of cash (supermarkets, petrol stations etc.) would be encouraged through pricing to pay their cash into the Post Office. Post Offices are more convenient and open longer hours so there was a natural case for choosing the Post Office. What's more, the depositor would count the money once and seal it discrete envelopes of say, units of £100, £500 or £1000.  The Post Office would take the money on trust, but commit to counting it not on receipt, but within a fixed period, of say five days. Thus within the Post Office, money could be handled very easily and its source was clearly marked.  The money would be counted at the time it was needed (i.e. when the envelope needed to be opened). Discrepancies were reported to the Giro, so that any attempt at systematic fraud could be easily identified. And the Giro could charge both the depositor for the deposit and the Post Office as an internal charge for the provision of the cash. As these charges were lower than those being charged by the commercial banks, everybody was happy. The Post Office internal handling of cash also became much simplified by the handling of fixed value envelopes.

The government, with the advice of consultants Cooper Brothers, gave a "Green Light" to the continuation plan. However charges were doubled for the majority of customers, the 'same day' service was changed to a 'next day' service, and staffing was reduced from 3,500 to 3,000.

The new plan was a great success and provided a firm financial foundation for its operations, although at some cost to the great plan to move the country over to using the Giro for remittances instead of the banks.

Banking for the masses 

By the late 1970s, one pound in every four pounds deposited in cash at a bank in the UK was deposited with the National Giro at the Post Office. This would later rise to one pound in every three. The organisation was again profitable and repaying its capital costs. Indeed, its rate of return on capital was higher than that of the commercial banks, and this allowed the government to relax the constraints it had placed on the National Giro and even allow for further capitalisation.

In 1978, National Giro renamed itself National Girobank to re-establish itself in the minds of the public as a bank, rather than some quasi non-bank.  Its status as a bank had been fixed in law, but it had until now been reluctant to use the term. It also re-launched its ambition to be the People's Bank, and was the first bank to offer free banking to UK personal customers (provided the account was in credit). This included free postage for the remittance of documents to the Giro Centre as well as free cheques and deposits (the terms inpayments and outpayments were dropped).

The new campaign was a great success and at first the bank had trouble keeping up with the flow of new business it generated.

Later the bank dropped the word National from its title, simply being known as Girobank plc as a prelude to privatisation.

Although the bank gained a large number of new accounts it never reached the level of penetration achieved by the European Postgiros to enable it to become the main payment clearing system in the UK as was the dream of its creators. By the late 1980s, Girobank was Britain's sixth largest bank. The main reasons are given in the next two sections.

Competition 

The commercial banks had not been slow to respond to the challenge of competing with National Giro and had developed their own credit transfer service known as Bank Giro, primarily aimed at the same utilities that the Giro had attracted. It still mainly required a visit to a bank branch and there was no free postage for the remitter.

The banks had also responded to the criticism that they were secretive about their tariffs and for the first time published a standard tariff for personal customers. They also began heavy advertising to the personal banking sector in order to capture the customers that National Giro had been forced to give up on during the period between the Green Light and the relaunch of Free Banking some seven years later. They had also adopted new services such as credit cards, personal loans and revolving credit accounts which Girobank could not easily do until it had a significant base.

Although the Giro did offer personal loans through a third party, it did not offer many of these main services on its own behalf until after the relaunch in 1978. It added savings accounts, overdrafts, revolving credit accounts, credit and debit cards, and was instrumental in the formation of the LINK ATM consortium of smaller banks and building societies which led the commercial clearing banks to begin linking their own networks which they had hitherto refused to do. It was also quick to establish internet banking and mass market it to its customers.

Privatisation and beyond 

The Alliance & Leicester won a bidding process for the Girobank operation in 1989 after the government decided to privatise it. The transaction was completed in 1990 and by this time the bank was essentially indistinguishable from its competitors, apart from its use of post offices to transact cash business. The contract with the Post Office was to continue to be an exclusive one for a fixed period after privatisation. After privatisation, the bank expanded and opened a £9.5 million operations centre in Wigan.

The personal banking business of Girobank became part of the Alliance & Leicester Building Society. The Business Banking arm continued to use the Girobank name as a wholly owned subsidiary of the Alliance and Leicester, repositioned as a cash handler and credit card processor for retailers and other banks. In 2003 the Girobank brand was dropped, with the business renamed Alliance & Leicester Commercial Bank following further consolidation in the Alliance & Leicester Group. In May 2010, Alliance & Leicester was acquired by Grupo Santander and the name Alliance & Leicester was replaced by Santander UK.

The name "Girobank" continued in use on some giro credits intended for paying bills, along with the Alliance & Leicester "plus" logo. Some councils were continuing to use the original name "Post Office Giro" in 2011.

On 17 March 2009, a campaign was launched to bring back Girobank. Backers included MPs, trade unions and small businesses.

Successors 
Nowadays, the Post Office provides cash services to many banks on a commercial basis. In April 2013 the Post Office announced it would be launching a retail banking service accessible through Post Office branches under the Post Office Money brand, now run by the private bank, the Bank of Ireland

Cultural significance 

The term girocheque quickly became associated with welfare dependence. Worse still, the name was often associated with Girobank in the public psyche, making little distinction between the welfare cheque and the business. Having a giro account meant writing one's own girocheques, and although recipients of girocheques did not need to have (and most did not have) a giro account, girocheques issued by personal customers were sometimes viewed with suspicion by the recipient. They also carried the name and address of the issuer, making them noticeably different from the cheques issued by other banks and noticeably similar to welfare girocheques. This issue was rectified in the 1978 relaunch: the term girocheque was dropped in favour of the more neutral cheque.

Before the use of electronic transfers of payments became the norm in the United Kingdom, the fortnightly "giro" payment was the normal way of distributing benefit payments. When unemployment peaked in the 1980s, large numbers of people would receive their benefit payment on the same day leading the concept of giro day, marked by the settlement of small debts and a noticeable increase in drinking, partying, and festive activities. It is the focus of the 1996 film Waiting for Giro.

See also
 National Savings and Investments
 Current account (banking)

References

Defunct banks of the United Kingdom
Economy of Merseyside
Defunct companies based in Liverpool
Banks established in 1968
Banks disestablished in 2003
1968 establishments in the United Kingdom
Postal savings system